Noodle Box Pty Ltd is an Australian- based multinational stir fried noodle quick service restaurant chain headquartered in Melbourne, Victoria, Australia founded by Josh James and David Milne in 1996.

Today Noodle Box is Australia's largest franchised noodle restaurant chain, with a network of over 70 restaurants across the country.

All of Noodle Box restaurants are franchised, with master franchise partners in the Middle East and Mauritius. This move towards franchising the brand was delivered under the strategic direction of current CEO, Ian Martin, previously the CFO of Yum! Restaurants in Asia, and Group CEO of Gloria Jeans Coffee.

Growth strategy
In October 2015, Noodle Box announced a strategic takeover of the noodle QSR network, Wok in a Box. This consolidation of the brands makes Noodle Box the largest noodle-based QSR in Australia, with more than 100 restaurants across the country.

See also
 List of restaurant chains in Australia

References

External links
 

Restaurants established in 1996
1996 establishments in Australia
Fast-food chains of Australia
Fast-food poultry restaurants
Asian restaurants in Australia
Noodle restaurants